Eugene Kohn (January 26, 1887 – April 1, 1977) was an American Reconstructionist rabbi, writer and editor.

Born in Newark, New Jersey he attended the Jewish Theological Seminary of America and in 1912 received ordination. It was here that he met Rabbi Mordecai Kaplan who taught him homiletics. Between 1912 and 1939 he served as a congregational rabbi in Conservative synagogues in the U.S. states of Maryland, New Jersey, New York, Wisconsin and Ohio. He also served as the president of the Rabbinical assembly 1936–1937.

He played a central role in the Reconstructionist movement. He edited its journal The Reconstructionist and, alongside Kaplan and Ira Eisenstein, edited  The New Haggadah  (1941), The Sabbath Prayer Book (1945) and The Reconstructionist Prayer Book (1948). Alongside Jack Cohen, Eisenstein and Milton Steinberg he was one of Kaplan's main disciples.

Works
 Manual for Teaching Biblical History  (1917)
 The Future of Judaism in America  (1934)
 The Future of Judaism in America  (1934)
 Religion and Humanity  (1953)
 Religious Humanism: A Jewish Interpretation  (1953)
 Good to be a Jew  (1959)
 Shir Hadash (1939) (edited)
 New Haggadah (1941) (edited)
 The Sabbath Prayer Book (1945) (edited)
 The Reconstructionist Prayer Book (1948) (edited)
 Mordecai M. Kaplan: An Evaluation (1952) (edited)

References

External links
 
 

American Reconstructionist rabbis
American Conservative rabbis
American Jewish theologians
1887 births
1977 deaths
New York University alumni
Jewish Theological Seminary of America semikhah recipients
Clergy from Newark, New Jersey
Religious naturalists
American Zionists
Jewish American writers
Writers from New Jersey
20th-century American rabbis
Reconstructionist Zionist rabbis